A Wife on Trial is a 1917 American silent drama film directed by Ruth Ann Baldwin and starring Mignon Anderson, Leo Pierson, and L.M. Wells.

Cast
 Mignon Anderson as Phyllis Narcissa
 Leo Pierson as Allan Harrington
 L.M. Wells as Horace de Guenther
 Julia Jackson as Mrs. de Guenther
 George C. Pearce as Wallis

References

Bibliography
 Donald W. McCaffrey & Christopher P. Jacobs. Guide to the Silent Years of American Cinema. Greenwood Publishing, 1999.

External links
 

1917 films
1917 drama films
1910s English-language films
American silent feature films
Silent American drama films
American black-and-white films
Universal Pictures films
1910s American films